The Bentall procedure is a type of cardiac surgery involving composite graft replacement of the aortic valve, aortic root, and ascending aorta, with re-implantation of the coronary arteries into the graft.  This operation is used to treat combined disease of the aortic valve and ascending aorta, including lesions associated with Marfan syndrome.  The Bentall procedure was first described in 1968 by Hugh Bentall and Antony De Bono. It is considered a standard for individuals who require aortic root replacement, and the vast majority of individuals who undergo the surgery receive mechanical valves.

Alternatives
The Bentall operation entails replacement of the aortic valve, aortic root and ascending aorta, but other operations may be used when all three components are not involved.
 Normal aortic root: The re-implantation of the coronary arteries is prone to complications, and aortic root replacement should be avoided when possible.  The aortic valve and ascending aorta can be replaced in separate steps, without root replacement.
 Normal aortic valve with annular dilation and ascending aneurysm (frequently found in Marfan syndrome): Artificial heart valves may wear out or require anticoagulation, and a valve-sparing aortic root replacement allows replacement of the aortic root +/- ascending aorta, while allowing a person to keep their own aortic valve and avoid the problems of aortic valve replacement.

Indications
 Aortic aneurysm
 Aortic regurgitation
 Aortic dissection

See also
 Aortic valve replacement
 Marfan syndrome
 Ross procedure
 Valve-sparing aortic root replacement
 Open aortic surgery
 Endovascular aneurysm repair

References

External links
 Cardiac Surgery in the Adult Ascending Aortic Aneurysms

Cardiac surgery